Isauria dilucidella is a species of moth in the family Pyralidae. It was described by Philogène Auguste Joseph Duponchel in 1836. It is found in most of Europe (except Portugal, Ireland, Great Britain, Fennoscandia, the Benelux, Poland and the Baltic region), Algeria, the United Arab Emirates, Syria, Lebanon, the Palestinian territories, Iraq, Turkmenistan, Mongolia, as well as Georgia, Kazakhstan, Armenia, Turkey, Iran and Afghanistan.

The wingspan is 19–24 mm.

The larvae feed on Lotus corniculatus and Astragalus monspessulanus. They are reddish brown and yellowish ventrally and with a yellow head. They live in a spun tube.

References

Moths described in 1836
Phycitinae
Moths of Europe
Moths of Africa
Moths of Asia
Taxa named by Philogène Auguste Joseph Duponchel